Sinodiscus is an extinct genus from a well-known class of fossil marine arthropods, the trilobites. It lived during the late Atdabanian stage, which lasted from 530 to 524 million years ago during the early part of the Cambrian Period.

 Dai and Zhang (2013) were able to reconstruct both the morphology and ontogeny of S. changyangensis Zhang based on a large number of well preserved examples from the lower Cambrian Shuijingtuo Formation in Changyang, Hubei Province, South China.

References

Cambrian trilobites
Eodiscina
Trilobite families
Fossils of China